Anton Bruckner composed eight cantatas during his life, the earliest Vergißmeinnicht, in 1845, the last, Helgoland, in 1893.

Kronstorf and Sankt Florian 
The five cantatas, composed between 1845 and 1855 during Bruckner's stay as schoolteacher's assistant in Kronstorf and as organist in Sankt Florian, were Name-day cantatas.

During his stay as schoolteacher's assistant in Kronstorf Bruckner composed his first cantata:
 Bruckner composed the cantata Musikalischer Versuch nach dem Kammer-Styl (Musical essay in chamber style), WAB 93, in D major for his teacher aggregation in May 1845.
 He made a second version to celebrate the name day of Alois Knauer, the parish priest of Kronstorf.
 He sent thereafter a third version, which he entitled  (Do not forget me), to remind Friedrich Mayer of the promise to provide him with an employment in the St. Florian Abbey.
During his stay as organist in Sankt Florian, Bruckner composed the following four name-day cantatas:
 The Arneth Cantata  (Hail father! To you on this noble celebration), WAB 61, is a cantata in D major composed in 1852 for the name day of Michael Arneth.
 The Mayer Cantata  (Let's go, brothers! and take the strings into our hands!), WAB 60, is a cantata in D major composed in 1855 for the name day of Friedrich Mayer.
 The Festgesang Sankt Jodok sproß aus edlem Stamme (Festive song "Saint Judoc came from a noble house"), WAB 15, is a cantata in C major composed at the end of 1855 for the name day of Jodok Stülz, the dean of the St. Florian Abbey.

Linz and Vienna
In the 1860s, during his stay in Linz, after the end of Sechter's and Kitzler's tuition, Bruckner composed the following two cantatas:
 The festive cantata  (Praise the Lord), WAB 16, is a religious cantata in D major composed in 1862 for the celebration of the laying of the foundation stone of the new Mariä-Empfängnis-Dom of Linz. 
 Germanenzug, WAB 70, is a secular, patriotic cantata in D minor composed in 1863–1864 on a text by August Silberstein for competition at the first .  
Thirty years later, during his stay in Vienna, Bruckner composed this last cantata:
 Helgoland, WAB 71, is a secular, patriotic cantata in G minor composed in 1893 on another text by August Silberstein to celebrate the 50th birthday of the Men's Choir of Vienna.

References

Sources 
 Anton Bruckner – Sämtliche Werke, Band XXII/1: Kantaten und Chorwerke I (1845–1855), Musikwissenschaftlicher Verlag der Internationalen Bruckner-Gesellschaft, Franz Burkhart, Rudolf H. Führer and Leopold Nowak (Editor), Vienna, 1987
 Anton Bruckner – Sämtliche Werke, Band XXII/2: Kantaten und Chorwerke II (1862–1893), Musikwissenschaftlicher Verlag der Internationalen Bruckner-Gesellschaft, Franz Burkhart, Rudolf H. Führer and Leopold Nowak (Editor), Vienna, 1987
 Uwe Harten, Anton Bruckner. Ein Handbuch. , Salzburg, 1996. .
 Cornelis van Zwol, Anton Bruckner 1824-1896 - Leven en werken, uitg. Thoth, Bussum, Netherlands, 2012.

External links